Czerniawski (feminine: Czerniawska, plural: Czerniawscy) , sometimes spelled Cherniawski, Cherniawsky, Cherniawsky, Czerniavski, or Cherniavsky is a Polish surname. It is a toponymic surname derived from any of the Polish locations named  or Czerniawka. Notable people with the surname include:

 Dustin Cherniawski (born 1981), Canadian football player, Emirates American Football League executive
 Fiona Czerniawska (born 1961), writer, management consultant
 Józefa Czerniawska-Pęksa (born 1937), Polish cross-country skier
 Piotr Czerniawski (born 1976), Polish poet
 Roman Czerniawski (1910–1985), Polish Air Force pilot
 Ryszard Czerniawski (1952–2019), Polish lawyer and economist

References

Polish-language surnames